The 1936 United States presidential election in West Virginia took place on November 3, 1936, as part of the 1936 United States presidential election. West Virginia voters chose eight representatives, or electors, to the Electoral College, who voted for president and vice president.

West Virginia was won by incumbent President Franklin D. Roosevelt (D–New York), running with Vice President John Nance Garner, with 60.56 percent of the popular vote, against Governor Alf Landon (R–Kansas), running with Frank Knox, with 39.20 percent of the popular vote. Owing to powerful support for Roosevelt in labor-conscious coal-mining areas of the south and industrial areas of the Northern Panhandle, Roosevelt more than doubled his 1932 margin despite losing Jackson, Mason and Roane Counties. In McDowell County, which had not voted Democratic since 1884, FDR improved from 43.36 percent to 71.79 percent, and he made double-digit gains in adjacent Mingo, Logan, Wyoming, Raleigh and Fayette Counties.

Despite Roosevelt’s appeal to coal miners and other industrial workers, West Virginia still voted 2.90 points more Republican than the nation at-large, helped by Landon gains in the central regions of the state. This would be the last presidential election where West Virginia voted more Republican than the nation until 1972.

Results

Results by county

References

West Virginia
1936
1936 West Virginia elections